The R691 road is a regional road in Ireland which runs west-east from the centre of Cashel in County Tipperary to the N76 near Callan in County Kilkenny.

See also
Roads in Ireland
National primary road
National secondary road

References
Roads Act 1993 (Classification of Regional Roads) Order 2006 – Department of Transport

Regional roads in the Republic of Ireland
Roads in County Tipperary
Roads in County Kilkenny